Defiance College is a private college located in Defiance, Ohio and affiliated with the United Church of Christ. The campus includes eighteen buildings and access to the  Thoreau Wildlife Sanctuary.

History

The college began as Defiance Female Seminary in 1850 and was opened by the Christian Connection (now part of the UCC, see above) to provide schooling for young women. William Curtis Holgate, a local businessman, donated most of the campus. In 1903 the Defiance Female Seminary formally became Defiance College, making it one of only two religious-affiliated colleges to begin operation in Ohio during the 20th century. Much of the institution's early growth occurred under Peter McReynolds who was named president in 1902. The following years saw growth in students, endowment, and facilities with the addition of most of the original campus buildings.

McCann era
Defiance College grew and flourished under President Kevin McCann's leadership (1951–1964). Academic programs expanded, and enrollment grew. The physical appearance of the campus changed significantly. President Dwight D. Eisenhower paid two visits to Defiance College. On October 15, 1953, he laid the cornerstone for Anthony Wayne Library of American Study . Eisenhower re-visited the campus on May 26, 1963, to deliver the commencement address, at which time the college announced that one room in the library had been designated "the Eisenhower Room," honoring the friendship between Eisenhower and Kevin C. McCann.

Schauffler moves to Defiance
The Schauffler College of Religious and Social Work in Cleveland had four-year students from more countries than any other, but it failed financially and merged with the graduate school of theology at Oberlin College. When Oberlin closed that school in 1967, the Schauffler endowment was moved to Defiance College, which created the Schauffler Center and later built Schauffler Hall.

Athletics
The Defiance College Yellow Jackets compete in Heartland Collegiate Athletic Conference (HCAC) as an NCAA Division III school.

Men's
 Baseball
 Basketball
 Cross Country
 Football
 Golf
 Soccer
 Tennis
 Track and Field
 Wrestling

Women's
 Basketball
 Cross Country
 Golf
 Soccer
 Softball
 Tennis
 Track and Field
 Volleyball

Notable alumni
 John Ashton, film actor
 Pam Borton, former Division 1 Final Four women's basketball head coach
 Ben Davis, professional football player
 Esquire Jauchem, producer, director and designer in theater, opera, dance and television
 Don Martindale, "Wink", professional football coach
 Richard Mourdock, Treasurer of State, Indiana
 Bruce Shingledecker, Alaskan wildlife painter

References

External links
Official website

 
Education in Defiance County, Ohio
United Church of Christ in Ohio
Private universities and colleges in Ohio
Universities and colleges affiliated with the United Church of Christ
Educational institutions established in 1850
Buildings and structures in Defiance County, Ohio
College